USS Barnegat may refer to the following ships of the United States Navy:

 , a steel-hulled, single-screw, ocean-going tugboat completed in 1891
 , was a seaplane tender, launched on 23 May 1941

See also
 

United States Navy ship names